An intercept message is a telephone recording informing the caller that the call cannot be completed, for any of a number of reasons ranging from local congestion, to disconnection of the destination phone, number dial errors or network trouble along the route.

Background
Before automation, calls to a disconnected or non-working number would be diverted to an intercept operator. The operator would ask what number the subscriber was attempting to call, determine the reason for the intercept and relay the information to the calling party.

The first automatic intercept systems used rotating magnetic drums containing multiple recorded phrases, with a computer or mechanical control system playing phrases in the proper sequence. Initially, the caller was given the option to remain on the line for a live operator after the announcement was completed; this has since been removed.

These messages are generally performed by female voices, although male voices are used as well.

Jane Barbe, Pat Fleet, and Joyce Gordon are well known for being the voices behind many intercept messages originating in the United States.

Many of these recordings end with the phrase "This is a recording" to let the callers know that they have not reached a live operator.

Message wording
The precise wording of intercept messages is left to the discretion of each local telephone company, except that most such messages nowadays start with one of several special information tones, standardized by Telcordia when it was still called Bellcore.

In the 1970s, for example, New York Telephone used the following:

Bell of Pennsylvania used the following:

In rural areas, the name of the town from which the exchange service is furnished was often included in the message; this was especially true if the telephone company providing the service was not part of the Bell System.

Generic message adopted
 
By the 1980s, a standardized generic message was adopted, and is in use in a vast majority of localities in America today. It reads as follows:

Customized message
The option also exists to replace the generic message with a customized message, as applicable, such as in cases where a subscriber's telephone number has changed, usually due to relocation. This service is known in America as Number Referral Service, and in Britain as Ceased Number Intercept. An example of a Number Referral Service intercept message is:

Message triggers

Cancelled service
When a customer moves and cancels their telephone service, an intercept message is often used even if no new number has replaced the old one. 

A similar intercept occurs if a number has recently been unlisted; no new number is provided:

In the past, the call would be forwarded to an intercept operator after usually two readings of the message; today, however, this procedure is not observed, and a fast busy signal follows the second reading of the message instead.

Incorrect number dialed
A different intercept message is used when the caller has dialed a number the first three digits of which have not yet been assigned within that area code. This message, too, formerly varied by locality; the following was used in New York City in the 1960s:

The standard version of this message in use today is the following.  This is used when the three-digit exchange does not exist in that area code.

Most of these messages often include the phrase "Your call cannot be completed as dialed." Sometimes a message would say to first dial a 1 or a 0 (the toll prefix for a trunk call) plus the area code of the called number. A message may also be played when 0 or 1 followed by an area code is prepended unnecessarily on landline phone calls to local destinations. As of 2021, area code dialing is required even for local calls, making the "not necessary to dial a 1 or 0" message no longer relevant.

Toll-free number calling area
As the owner of a toll-free telephone number must pay to receive all long-distance calls (including misdialed calls), a toll-free subscriber may request that the responsible organization for a toll-free number (often but not always the inbound long-distance carrier) configure the number to only be reachable from specific area codes, from within one province or state or from specified cities. (The original Bell System InWATS used wide multiple-state or province "bands" as calling areas; modern systems route more finely.)

In Canada, this message is translated: "Le numéro que vous avez composé n'est pas disponible de votre région". The announcement is repeated, then followed by a numeric identifier.

Network congestion
AT&T has an intercept message that is heard due to network congestion: "All circuits are busy now, please try your call again 914-2T". The number and digits at the end identify the network edge or Tandem switch the caller's local exchange company routed the call to. There is also a network message heard when an attempt to route a call to a nodal or ISDN T1 on the terminating end fails due to no call set-up signal from the PBX being received by the far-end Tandem or edge switch "Your call did not go through, 9142T".

Optus has an intercept message which is heard by Optus customers when the network is congested or when a technical fault prevents customers from making phone calls: "Unfortunately due to temporary service difficulties, we are unable to connect your call at this time. Please try again later". After the message is played, the call will disconnect.

Phone left off-hook
If a phone receiver is left off-hook, sometimes an intercept message is used to inform callers to hang up their phone receivers. The most common message reads as follows:

A formerly-used variation of this message was as follows:

The message may be repeated, then followed by a loud, rasping off-hook tone intended to remain audible even if the handset is on the desktop instead of at the subscriber's ear. This tone is louder than the standard busy/fast busy signal.

In Australia
In Australia, a user is often given the following message signifying that a call could not be connected. It is voiced by Anna Hruby, who is known as "The Telstra Lady" for her distinctive and memorable voice. This only applies to the Telstra Network; however, Optus and other networks have similar messages, each voiced by a different individual.

 Telstra: "Your call could not be connected; please check the number and try again." and "The number you have called is not connected, please check the number before calling again."
 Optus: "Optus wishes to advise that the number you have dialed was incomplete or incorrect. Please check the number and dial again."
 Vodafone AU: "You've mis-dialled a number; your call will not be connected. If you want emergency services, please dial Triple Zero."

The message is usually then followed by a series of letters and numbers signifying the local access switch associated with the caller's exchange or the receiving party's exchange.

Variations and enhancements
In almost any case, a telephone switch may be programmed to return a slow or fast busy signal instead of an intercept message. Intercept messages also often end with a coded identifier signifying which switch the message is being played by; this can be useful for diagnosing network problems.

References

External links
 Large collection of intercept messages from telephone companies, past and present

Telephony
Audiovisual ephemera